Bringing Up Bobby is a 2011 comedy-drama film written, directed and produced by Famke Janssen (marking her first directorial effort). Milla Jovovich stars as a European ex-con artist and single mother in the United States. The film had its world premiere at the 2011 Cannes Film Festival on May 12, and received a limited release in the United States on September 28, 2012.

Synopsis
Ukrainian con artist Olive and her 10-year-old son Bobby arrive in Oklahoma to begin a new life, and enjoy a series of adventures. However, when Olive's criminal past catches up to her, she is faced with putting her son's happiness before her own. Mary deals with the death of her own son by becoming adoptive mother to Bobby, providing him a home with her husband Kent.

Cast
Milla Jovovich as Olive
Bill Pullman as Kent
Rory Cochrane as Walt
Marcia Cross as Mary
Spencer List as Bobby
Ray Prewitt as Chuck Lee Buck
Justin Hall as Jamie

Production
In summer 2010, the film was shot over 20 days in Oklahoma. The film was inspired by Janssen's own perception as a European who came to live in the United States.

Soundtrack
The original film score was composed by Junkie XL (as Tom Holkenborg). In addition, the soundtrack includes a cover version of "Proud Mary", sung by lead actress Milla Jovovich in Ukrainian. The song plays in the background at the beginning of the film. The recording, which is credited to Milla Jovovich with The Modern Mothers, is based on Ike & Tina Turner's popular version of the song. After the recording session, Jovovich's voice was hoarse for a few days.

The American alternative rock band The Flaming Lips recorded a version of "Amazing Grace", also in Ukrainian. The recording plays during the end credits. Lead singer Wayne Coyne does not speak the language but sang the lyrics phonetically. The soundtrack also contains various country, folk and jazz songs by artists such as Johnny Paycheck, Count Basie, Jack Teagarden, Cat Stevens, Jorma Kaukonen, Ray Hatcher, Roy Lanham & The Whippoorwills, and Joe Mahan. A soundtrack album was not released.

Release
Video Film Express holds all media rights for the Netherlands, while Monterey Media holds all rights for the United States and Canada.

Festivals
Bringing Up Bobby was selected to screen at the following film festivals:
2012 Newport Beach Film Festival
2012 Dallas International Film Festival
2012 Santa Cruz Film Festival
2012 Nashville Film Festival
2012 White Sands International Film Festival
2012 Omaha Film Festival
2010 Deauville American Film Festival
2011 Savannah Film Festival

Reception
The film has received mainly negative reviews, with a 'rotten'  rating on review aggregator Rotten Tomatoes and a 4.9 rating on the Internet Movie Database.

References

External links
 
 
 
 

2011 films
2011 comedy-drama films
2011 independent films
American comedy-drama films
American independent films
Dutch comedy-drama films
Dutch independent films
Films about con artists
Films scored by Junkie XL
Films set in Oklahoma
Films shot in Oklahoma
2011 directorial debut films
2010s English-language films
2010s American films